Alan L. Hirsch (born November 25, 1959) has worked as a political science professor at Williams College, serving as the chair of justice and law studies there; a writer of books regarding politics and law, and an activist in reforming unjust law practices. Hirsch works as a lawyer and as a trial consultant, having qualified as a false confessions expert witness in 22 jurisdictions. He received his B.A. at Amherst College and his J.D. at Yale University. He has also previously taught law at Hartwick College and Bennington College.

Career
His books have been influential in guiding discussion over politics, history, and law. His book Awarding Attorneys' Fees and Managing Fee Litigation was cited in Oxford Academic's article "Incentive Structures for Class Action Lawyers" and further works have been examined in publications such as The New York Times. His articles on legal studies can be found in publications such as the Berkeley Journal of Criminal Law, Ohio State Criminal Law Journal, and UC Hastings Law Review.

He also worked as a senior consultant at UCLA School of Law's Williams Project on Sexual Orientation Law and Public Policy, co-publishing an article in the Los Angeles Times with Brad Sears refuting arguments against same-sex couples raising children.

Works
A Short History of Presidential Election Crises (And How to Prevent the Next One) (City Lights Publishers, 2020)  
Impeaching the President (City Lights Publishers, 2018) 
The Duke of Wellington, Kidnapped!: The Incredible True Story of the Art Heist that Shocked a Nation (Counterpoint, 2016) 
Awarding Attorneys’ Fees and Managing Fee Litigation (Federal Judicial Center, 2005)
For The People: What the Constitution Really Says About Your Rights (Free Press, 1998, co-authored with Akhil Amar) 
Verdict: Assessing the Civil Jury System (contributor, 1993) 
Talking Heads: Political Talk Shows and Their Star Pundits (St. Martin’s, 1991)

References

Further reading and external links
 http://truthaboutfalseconfessions.com
https://political-science.williams.edu/profile/ahirsch/
http://www.counterpointpress.com/authors/alan-hirsch/
http://www.citylights.com/book/?GCOI=87286100525430&fa=description
http://www.nytimes.com/1998/03/08/books/reading-your-rights.html
https://books.google.com/books?id=ol6DUHk3Ck4C&pg=PA400&lpg=PA400&dq=alan+hirsch+lawyer+impact&source=bl&ots=QhfImFwVOL&sig=CjYzlJ_B_b0MUyhQPJeMu9tVQGI&hl=en&sa=X&ved=0ahUKEwjpqqqzqODZAhUp0oMKHe9JCZc4ChDoAQguMAE#v=onepage&q=alan%20hirsch%20lawyer%20impact&f=false
https://academic.oup.com/jleo/article-abstract/20/1/102/849885
https://scholarship.law.berkeley.edu/cgi/viewcontent.cgi?article=1005&context=bjcl
http://articles.latimes.com/2004/apr/04/opinion/oe-sears4

Yale Law School alumni
Amherst College alumni
Williams College faculty
American political scientists
1959 births
Living people